Saint-Lazare or St. Lazare may refer to:


Places

France
 Rue Saint-Lazare, a street in Paris
 Gare Saint-Lazare, a railway station in Paris
 Réseau Saint-Lazare, a network of railway lines originating from Gare Saint Lazare
 Saint-Lazare (Paris Métro), a railway station in Paris
 Saint-Lazare Prison, Paris

Canada
 Saint-Lazare, Quebec, a suburb of Montreal
 St. Lazare, Manitoba, an unincorporated community

Other uses
 Pierre Bertholon de Saint-Lazare (1741–1800), French physicist

See also
 Autun Cathedral (Cathédrale Saint-Lazare d'Autun), Autun, France

fr:Saint Lazare